Lawrence John Swider (February 1, 1955 – August 7, 2021) was an American football punter. He attended DuBois Area High School in DuBois, Pennsylvania where he was a stand out athlete. He played in the National Football League from 1979 to 1982. He then played in the United States Football League for the Pittsburgh Maulers and the Jacksonville Bulls.

Swider died on August 7, 2021, in Fayetteville, Texas, at age 66.

References

1955 births
2021 deaths
People from Limestone, Maine
American football punters
Pittsburgh Panthers football players
Detroit Lions players
St. Louis Cardinals (football) players
Tampa Bay Buccaneers players
Pittsburgh Maulers players
Jacksonville Bulls players
Players of American football from Maine